Vicente Aparicio Vila (born September 14, 1969 in Pinedo) is a former Spanish cyclist.

Palmarès
1989
1st Volta a Lleida
1994
6th Paris–Nice
7th Vuelta a España
1995
3rd Spanish National Road Race Championships
3rd Critérium du Dauphiné Libéré

Grand Tour results

Tour de France
1994: 67th
1995: 21st
1996: DNF

Vuelta a España
1993: 34th
1994: 7th
1995: DNF
1996: DNF

Giro d'Italia
1998: 59th

References

1969 births
Living people
Spanish male cyclists
Cyclists from the Valencian Community